Takis Tridimas (complete name Panagiotis Takis Tridimas, in Greek Παναγιωτης Τακης Τριδημας) is a professor of European Law in King's College London and a former professor in Queen Mary University of London. He is a member of the bar in Middle Temple. He has served as référendaire to Sir Francis Jacobs in the European Court of Justice.

References

External links 

Living people
Members of the Middle Temple
20th-century Greek lawyers
British legal scholars
Academics of King's College London
Academics of Queen Mary University of London
Year of birth missing (living people)